...And Then We Saw Land is the English band Tunng's fourth album, released in March 2010.

Track listing
"Hustle" – 4:26
"It Breaks" – 3:27
"Don't Look Down or Back" – 4:56
"The Roadside" – 5:11
"October" – 3:47
"Sashimi" – 3:04
"With Whiskey" – 3:39
"By Dusk They Were in the City" – 5:13
"These Winds – 1:37
"Santiago" – 3:29
"Weekend Away" – 8:14

References 

Tunng albums
2010 albums
Thrill Jockey albums
Full Time Hobby albums